Ohtani Dam is a gravity dam located in Shimane Prefecture in Japan. The dam is used for water supply. The catchment area of the dam is 3.9 km2. The dam impounds about 14  ha of land when full and can store 1422 thousand cubic meters of water. The construction of the dam was started on 1954 and completed in 1957.

References

Dams in Shimane Prefecture
1957 establishments in Japan